
Year 568 (DLXVIII) was a leap year starting on Sunday (link will display the full calendar) of the Julian calendar. The denomination 568 for this year has been used since the early medieval period, when the Anno Domini calendar era became the prevalent method in Europe for naming years.

Events 
 By place 
 Europe 
 Spring – The Lombards, led by King Alboin, cross the Julian Alps. Their invasion of Northern Italy is almost unopposed; withered Byzantine forces, that remain in the Po Valley and are based at Ravenna, are no match for the overwhelming Lombard incursion. Residents of the Italian countryside flee at the Lombards' approach. Some retreat to the barrier islands along the shore of the Northern Adriatic Sea, where they establish permanent settlements: the nascent city of Venice.
 The Byzantines abandon present-day Lombardy and Tuscany, to establish a frontier march in the hills south of Ravenna (still known as Le Marche). Bavarians, Sarmatians, Saxons and Taifali, join the invasion en route. As they advance, the vacuum left behind them on the Balkan Peninsula is filled by Avars, Bulgars and Slavs.
 Sigebert I, king of Austrasia, repels a second attack from the Avars. His half brother Chilperic I strangles his wife Galswintha at the instigation of his mistress Fredegund.
 Liuvigild is declared co-king and heir after the second year of the reign of his brother Liuva I. He becomes ruler over the Visigoths in Hispania Citerior (Eastern Spain).
 Mummolus, Gallo-Roman prefect, defeats the Lombards at Embrun and expels them from Provence (Southern Gaul). 
 The Avar Khaganate attempts to expel Kutrigurs who had fled the Göktürks, ordering them to go south of the Sava River; those who leave generally fall under rule of the Turks.

 Britain 

 Æthelric succeeds his brother Adda as king of Bernicia (modern Scotland). He rules from 568–572 (approximate date).
 Battle of Wibbandun: Ceawlin of Wessex defeats Æthelberht of Kent (according to the Anglo-Saxon Chronicle).

 Asia 
 The Turks and Sassanids succeed in destroying the Hepthalites on the eastern frontier (approximate date).
 A Turkish khan sends emissaries to the Byzantine Empire (approximate date).

 By topic 
 Religion 
 Emperor Justin II and his wife Sophia send the Cross of Justin II ("Vatican Cross") to Rome, to improve the relations with the Byzantine Empire.
 Paulinus I, patriarch of Aquileia, flees with the treasures of his church and transfers them to the island of Grado.

Births 
 Feng Deyi, chancellor of the Tang Dynasty (d. 627)
 Ingund, princess, spouse of Visigoth prince  Hermenegild (d. 584)
 Liu Wenjing, chancellor of the Tang Dynasty (d. 619)

Deaths 
 Adda, king of Bernicia (approximate date)
 Galswintha, queen consort of Neustria, married to Chilperic I (b. 540)

References